Mary Coustas (born 16 September 1964) is an Australian actress, comedian and television personality and writer. Originally from Melbourne, Coustas often performs as the character "Effie", a stereotypical second-generation Greek Australian prone to malapropisms. She completed a Bachelor of Arts at Deakin University in Melbourne, majoring in performing arts and sub-majoring in journalism.

Coustas won the Logie Award for Most Popular Comedy Personality in 1993.

Theatre
Coustas' initial claim to fame was in the comedy stage show Wogs Out of Work alongside Nick Giannopoulos, George Kapiniaris and Simon Palomares.

In 2019, Coustas joined the Shooshi Mango boys and Giannopoulos on stage in a show named Fifty Shades of Ethnic.

Television career
Coustas appeared on the popular television sitcom Acropolis Now, from 1989 until 1992, in the role of Effie Stephanidis.

Since then she has appeared as Effie in other television shows and commercials. Effie also appeared in the interview show Effie, Just Quietly in 2001 and hosted her own short-lived talk show called Greeks on the Roof in 2003.

Coustas played straight dramatic roles in two police series: Skirts  in 1990 and Wildside in 1998. Other roles include Grass Roots, The Secret Life of Us and Good Guys Bad Guys. Her voice-over work includes The Magic Pudding, Hercules Returns and Always Greener. She also appeared as a guest on comedy game show Talkin' 'bout Your Generation in 2012, and had a guest role in the drama Rake.

Books and music
In 1992 Effie released a novelty single: a duet with another fictional character, Garry McDonald's Norman Gunston. The recording was their version of Andrew Lloyd Webber's Amigos Para Siempre. Coustas's book Effie's Guide to Being Up Yourself was published in 2003.

In her 2013 memoir All I know: a memoir of love, loss and life, Coustas looked back over her career, and reflected on the lives and deaths of her father, grandmother and daughter.

She co-starred in two comedic, mock music video entries for Eurovision, "Electronik Supersonik" (2004) and "I Am the Anti-Pope" (2006) starring Australian Comedian Santo Cilauro as a fictional Molvanian character Zladko Vladcik.
Cilauro, along with Rob Sitch and Tom Gleisner, created the popular Internet phenomenon character Zladko "ZLAD!" Vladcik, a Molvanian pop idol style musician. Zlad was performed by Cilauro to accompany the Jetlag Travel Guide to Molvanîa. Cilauro was, with Sitch and Gleisner, co-author of the Jetlag Travel Guides to Molvanîa, Phaic Tăn and San Sombrèro.

Personal life
Coustas was born in the Melbourne suburb of Collingwood.

Coustas married George Betsis in 2005. After 6 years of in vitro fertilisation, their first child was stillborn at 22 weeks. In August 2013, Coustas and her husband announced in an interview with 60 Minutes that she was 22 weeks pregnant and expecting their second child in early December 2013. Their daughter Jamie was born on 28 November 2013.

References

External links

1964 births
Actresses from Melbourne
Australian film actresses
Australian people of Greek descent
Australian television actresses
Australian women comedians
Living people
Logie Award winners
People from Collingwood, Victoria
Comedians from Melbourne
Deakin University alumni